Richard Reginald Goulden (1876–1932) was a British sculptor operational in the early 20th century.

Background

Richard Reginald Goulden was born in Dover on 30 August 1876 and christened at St. Mary's, Dover, on 1 October 1876. He was one of the four children of John James Goulden, born in Canterbury in 1841, and his wife Charlotte, née Wright, who was born at Witney, Oxfordshire. The couple were married at Ducklington in 1871.

His father, although trained as a journeyman cabinet-maker, set up a bookselling, stationery, and printing business in Dover in 1865, followed by a branch in Folkestone.  Unfortunately he died when Richard was only three and his wife carried on the business until 1902.

Richard was educated at Dover College and at the Dover School of Art from where he won a scholarship to the Royal College of Art in London. There he firstly studied architecture and then sculpture.  He was awarded prizes for both and a travelling scholarship for sculpture. When he returned from his travels he produced two panels for the Carnegie Trustees in Dunfermline and was invited to become their Art Advisor. Living in Dunfermline for two years, he executed several commissions, amongst them the fountain "Let Noble Ambition" and the statue of Carnegie himself. He also designed the Carnegie Hero medal.

During the Great War, Richard served with the Royal Engineers in France. He was "mentioned in despatches" on 30 April 1916 and given the rank of temporary captain.  He was injured sufficiently to be sent back to England.  There he spent some time at Brightlingsea in Essex where he was appointed adjutant to the Australian Engineers.  He then moved to London where he was attached to the Chief Engineer of the Royal Engineers and put in command of a special emergency Corps.

Richard Goulden died on 6 August 1932, leaving a widow, Muriel Olive Cecile, née Gant, and their children Wilma Ruth and Michael. He was buried at Newhaven and as a tribute to him, a replica of the bronze figure on the Dover War Memorial was erected at Newhaven cemetery’s entrance. 

Goulden's last work was the memorial in Kensal Green cemetery to Thomas Power O'Connor, journalist and politician, completed just before Goulden died. In 1997 a one-and-a-half life-size statue of a Gurkha Soldier was unveiled at Whitehall. This was the work of Philip Jackson but it was Goulden who created a smaller and much earlier version of the work and this stands at the head of the Foreign Office main staircase in Whitehall. Philip Jackson had based his statue on Goulden's 1924 work.

Further details of Goulden's War Service

Goulden’s service record is available at The National Archives under reference WO 374/28313. His service record contains a note of his promotion to temporary captain from 5 January 1916 to 19 June 1916 with 1/2 London Divisional Engineers and his record of service from 13 September 1914 to 24 June 1916 with 2/3 Field Company 2nd London Division. Royal Engineers- this lists various dates and activities/events, including the fact that he was awarded a "mention in despatches" on 30 April 1916. The file contains Army Form Z.3 covering his discharge on 25 July 1919. This describes his occupation in civil life as "Designer & Sculptor".

Exhibitions and Memberships of Societies

 Goulden exhibited at the Jubilee Exhibition of Works of Modern Artists organised by The Royal Glasgow Institute of the Fine Arts in 1911
 Goulden exhibited sixteen times at the Summer Exhibition of the Royal Academy of Arts between 1903 and 1932, this involving twenty-six works (portraits, medallions, statuettes, models for memorials and decorative schemes)
 He was an associate member of Royal Society of British Sculptors from 1923 to 1932.
 He was a member of Royal Society of British Sculptors from 1906 to 1932
 He was a member of Art Workers Guild from 1912 to 1932 and a committee member from 1928 to 1930.
 He was a member of the council of the Royal Society of British Sculptors from 1919 to 1926.

Works

Various

War memorials

Gallery

References

External links

1876 births
1932 deaths
English sculptors
English male sculptors
Modern sculptors
20th-century British sculptors
People from Dover, Kent
Alumni of the Royal College of Art
Royal Engineers officers
Military personnel from Kent
British Army personnel of World War I